Bill and Jan (Or Jan and Bill) is a studio album released by American country artists Bill Anderson and Jan Howard. It was released in January 1972 on Decca Records and was produced by Owen Bradley. It was the duo's third collaborative album together and featured singles that became hits on the Billboard country chart. The album itself would also chart on the Billboard country albums list in 1972.

Background and content
Bill and Jan (Or Jan and Bill) was recorded in several sessions between 1970 and 1971. All sessions were held at producer Owen Bradley's studio, Bradley's Barn, in Mount Juliet, Tennessee. Bradley had been Anderson and Howard's producer since first collaborating in 1965. He had also been producing both artists separately on the Decca label.

The album consisted of 11 tracks. Many of the tracks recorded for the album were cover versions of songs recorded by other artists. Among these songs was Webb Pierce's "More and More". The release also contained songs written by Anderson. These included "No Thanks I Just Had One" and "Knowing You're Mine".

Release and reception
Bill and Jan (Or Jan and Bill was released in January 1972 on Decca Records in a vinyl record format. On the first side, 5 songs were included and 6 songs were included on the flip side. The album reached number 9 on the Billboard Top Country Albums chart in April 1972. It became the duo's second album to reach the top 10 of that chart.

The album featured two singles that both became top 10 hits. The first was a cover of "Someday We'll Be Together", which reached number 4 on the Billboard Hot Country Singles chart in April 1970. The second single, "Dis-Satisfied", reached number 4 on the Billboard country songs chart in December 1971.

Both singles also became major hits on the Canadian RPM Country Tracks chart during this time. The highest-charting was "Dis-Satisfied", which reached number 3 in 1970.

Bill and Jan (Or Jan and Bill) was reviewed by Allmusic, receiving 2.5 out of 5 stars.

Track listing

Personnel
All credits are adapted from the liner notes of Bill and Jan (Or Jan and Bill).

Musical and technical personnel
 Bill Anderson – lead vocals
 Harold Bradley – guitar
 Owen Bradley – producer
 Steve Chapman – guitar
 Ray Edenton – guitar
 Buddy Harman – drums
 Jan Howard – lead vocals
 Roy Huskey – bass
 The Jordanaires – background vocals
 Hal Rugg – steel guitar
 Jerry Smith – piano
 Jimmy Woodard – organ

Chart performance

Release history

References

1972 albums
Bill Anderson (singer) albums
Jan Howard albums
Albums produced by Owen Bradley
Decca Records albums
Vocal duet albums